Lauren Ezersky is an American former cable TV host. Her show, Behind The Velvet Ropes, ran from 1989 to 2012.

Ezersky was born and raised in Yonkers, New York.

References

External links 
 Behind The Velvet Ropes
 At Chrome Hearts with Lauren Ezersky

American television personalities
American women television personalities
Living people
People from Yonkers, New York
Year of birth missing (living people)